Li-Ying College was the first recorded academy in Imperial Hong Kong.  It was founded circa 1075AD during the Song Dynasty (9601279).

History
The founder  (Cantonese: Tang Fu Heep) was a native of Jiangsu province in mainland China.  The school was located in the area known today as Kai Kung Leng Kam Tin, New Territories, Hong Kong.  The academy was well known for its large library of Chinese classics.   In imperial times, academies were designed with a strong emphasis on the Imperial examination system used to prepare scholar-officials for government work.   By the time of the Qing dynasty (16441911), the Chinese government in 1662 and 1664 closed down schools as a strategy to counter Ming dynasty (13681644) loyalists. The academy was in ruins by the early 19th century.

Notable alumni
 1259 - The first jìnshì degree under the Imperial examination system was granted to "Huang Shih".
 1685 - A descendant of the founder, "Tang Wen Wei" was granted a jìnshì degree and was appointed district magistracy in Zhejiang.
 1754 - Chiang Shih Yuan from the Tai Po District earned a jìnshì degree and became well known for his literary accomplishments in southern China.
 1789 - Tang Ying Yuen (Tang Kuen Hin), a well-known local calligrapher, passed his military examination.  He later built the "So Lay Yuen Study Hall" at "Shui Tau Tsuen" in Kam Tin.

See also
 History of education in China
 Imperial Hong Kong
 List of the oldest schools in the world

References

Kam Tin
Government schools in Hong Kong
Educational institutions established in the 11th century
Universities and colleges in Hong Kong
1075 establishments in Asia
11th-century establishments in China